Dušan Kolmokov (born 17 May 1985) is a Slovak footballer who plays as a goalkeeper for the Slovak 2. liga club FC Nitra.

External links
 at official club website 

1985 births
Living people
Slovak footballers
FK Dubnica players
FK Slovan Duslo Šaľa players
FC Nitra players
Slovak Super Liga players
Association football goalkeepers
Sportspeople from Topoľčany